USS S-23 (SS-128) was a first-group (S-1 or "Holland") S-class submarine of the United States Navy.

Construction and commissioning
S-23′s keel was laid down on 18 January 1919 by the Bethlehem Shipbuilding Corporation's Fore River Shipyard in Quincy, Massachusetts.  She was launched on 27 October 1920, sponsored by Miss Barbara Sears, and commissioned on 30 October 1923.

Service history

Early years 

Initially assigned to Submarine Division 11, Control Force, S-23 was based at New London, Connecticut, until 1931. During that time, she operated off the New England coast from late spring until early winter then moved south for winter and spring exercises. From 1925 on, her annual deployments included participation in Fleet Problems, and those maneuvers occasionally took her from the Caribbean Sea into the Pacific Ocean. In 1931, S-23 was transferred to the Pacific, and on 5 January 1931 she departed New London for the Panama Canal, California, and Hawaii. En route, she participated in Fleet Problem XII. On 25 April 1931, she arrived at her new home port, Pearl Harbor, Hawaii, whence she operated, with Submarine Division 7 for the next ten years. In June 1941, Division 7 became Division 41, and, on 1 September 1941, S-23 departed the Hawaiian Islands for California. An overhaul and operations off the United States West Coast took her into December 1941, when the United States entered World War II with the Japanese attack on Pearl Harbor of 7 December.

World War II
After the Pearl Harbor attack, S-23′s crew prepared for service in the Aleutian Islands. Radiant-type heaters were purchased in San Diego, California, to augment the heat provided by the galley range. Heavier and more waterproof clothing, including ski masks, were added to the regular issue provided to submarine crews. The submarine itself was fitted out for wartime service and, in January 1942, S-23 moved north to Dutch Harbor on Amaknak Island off Unalaska in the Aleutian Islands.

First war patrol 

On the afternoon of 7 February 1942, S-23 departed Dutch Harbor on her first war patrol. Within hours, she encountered the heavy seas and poor visibility which characterized the Aleutians. Waves broke over the bridge, battering those on duty there, and sent water cascading down the conning tower hatch. On 10 February 1942, S-23 stopped to jettison torn sections of the superstructure, a procedure she was to repeat on her subsequent patrols; and, on 13 February 1942, the heavy seas caused broken bones to some men on the bridge. For another three days, the submarine patrolled the great circle route from Japan, then headed home, arriving at Dutch Harbor on 17 February 1942.

February–June 1942
From Dutch Harbor, S-23 was ordered back to San Diego for overhaul and brief sound school duty. On her arrival at San Diego, her crew requested improved electrical, heating, and communications gear and the installation of a fathometer, radar, and keel-mounted sonar. The latter requests were to be repeated after each of her next three patrols, but became available only after her fourth patrol.

On 20 May, S-23 again departed for the Aleutians. Proceeding via Port Angeles, Washington, she arrived in Alaskan waters on 29 May 1942 and was directed to patrol to the west of Unalaska to guard against an anticipated Japanese attack. On 2 June 1942, however,  waves broke over the bridge and seriously injured two men. She headed for Dutch Harbor to transfer the men for medical treatment. Arriving the same day, she was still in the harbor the following morning, 3 June 1942, when Japanese carrier-based planes attacked the base.

Second war patrol 

After the first raid, S-23 cleared the harbor and within hours arrived in her assigned patrol area, where she remained until 11 June 1942. She was then ordered back to Dutch Harbor, replenished and was sent to patrol southeast of Attu, which the Japanese had occupied along with Kiska a few days earlier.

For the next 19 days, she hunted for Japanese logistic ships and warships en route to Attu and reconnoitered Attu's bays and harbors. She made several attempts to close targets, but fog, her slow speed, and her poor maneuverability precluded attacks in all but one case: On 17 June 1942, she fired on a tanker, but did not score. On 2 July 1942, she headed back to Unalaska and arrived at Dutch Harbor early on the morning of 4 July 1942.

Third war patrol 

During her third war patrol, conducted from 15 July to 18 August 1942, S-23 again patrolled primarily in the Attu area. On 6 August 1942, however, she was diverted closer to Kiska to support a U.S. Navy bombardment of the island. On 9 August 1942 , she returned to her patrol area, where her previous experiences in closing enemy targets were repeated.

Fourth war patrol 

Eight days after her return to Dutch Harbor, S-23 again headed west, and, on 28 August 1942, she arrived in her assigned area to serve as a protective scout during the U.S. occupation of Adak. During most of her time on station, the weather was overcast, but it proved to be the most favorable she had experienced in eight months of Alaskan operations. On 16 September 1942, she was recalled from patrol to meet her 20 September scheduled date of departure for San Diego for upkeep and sound school duty.

Fifth war patrol 

On 7 December 1942, S-23 returned to Unalaska, and, on 17 December, she got underway on her fifth war patrol. By 22 December, she was off western Attu, and on 23 December, she received orders to take up station off Paramushiro at the northern end of the Kuril Islands. On 24 December, she headed for the Kuril Islands. On 26 December,  from her destination, her stern plane operating gear outside the hull broke. Since submerging and depth control became difficult, she turned back for Dutch Harbor. Moving east, her mechanical difficulties increased; her stern planes damaged her propellers; her fouled rudder resulted in a damaged gear train. Nature added severe snow and ice storms after 3 January 1943. But, on 6 January 1943, S-23 made it into Dutch Harbor.

Using equipment and parts from her sister ship , S-23 was repaired at Dutch Harbor and at Kodiak, and on 28 January 1943 she departed her Unalaska base for another patrol in the Attu area. She spent 21 days on station, two of which, 6 and 7 February 1943, were spent repairing the port main motor control panel. She scored on no enemy ships and returned to Dutch Harbor on 26 February.

Sixth war patrol 

Refit, the submarine got underway for her last war patrol on 8 March 1943. Moving west, she arrived off the Kamchatka Peninsula on 14 March 1943 and encountered floes with ice 2.5 to 3 feet (0.75 to 0.9 m) thick. Her progress down the coast in search of the Japanese fishing fleet slowed, and, initially limited to moving during daylight hours, she rounded Cape Kronotsky on the afternoon of 16 March 1943 and Cape Lopatka on the morning of 19 March 1943. She then set a course back to the Aleutians which would take her across Japanese supply lanes between the Kuril and Aleutian Islands. On 26 March 1943, she took up patrol duty in the Attu area, and on 31 March 1943 departed her patrol area for her homeward voyage to Dutch Harbor.

April 1943–September 1945 

In April 1943, S-23 returned to San Diego. During the summer of 1943, she underwent an extensive overhaul. In the fall of 1943, she began providing training services to the sound school, which she continued through the end of World War II in August 1945.

Decommissioning and disposal
On 11 September 1945, S-23 departed San Diego bound for San Francisco, California, where she was decommissioned on 2 November 1945. On 16 November 1945, her name was struck from the Naval Vessel Register. Her hulk subsequently was sold for scrapping and was delivered to the purchaser, the Salco Iron and Metal Company of San Francisco, on 15 November 1946.

Awards
 American Defense Service Medal with "FLEET" clasp
 American Campaign Medal
 Asiatic-Pacific Campaign Medal with one battle star
 World War II Victory Medal

References 
 

United States S-class submarines
World War II submarines of the United States
Ships built in Quincy, Massachusetts
1920 ships
Ships of the Aleutian Islands campaign